Shaun Watson-Smith (born in Port Elizabeth) is a South African racing driver who has mainly raced in Touring Cars. He first entered the national production car championship in 1991, winning the overall championship a year later in 1992. In 1994 he got a works drive for the Opel team, helping to develop the new car. He was class B champion in 1995 driving his Opel two-litre Astra and also won his debut race in the South African Touring Car Championship. After finishing third in class in 1996, he went on to dominate the championship winning the title in 1997 and 1998. In 1999 he drove in the South African Touring Car Championship, finishing tenth on points in a Petronas Opel Vectra. He went on to finish second in the final full year of the championship. From 2001 through to 2003, he raced in the WesBank V8 Series, driving an Opel Astra. He never raced a full season, but won several selected races that he drove in.

In 2004 he got his big break in the British Touring Car Championship driving a works Proton Impian for Petronas Syntium Proton, alongside teammate Fariqe Hairuman. He impressed many people with his driving and pace that season, but the team was under-funded and the car was well off the pace of the other works teams. He placed fourteenth on points and at the end of the season Proton withdrew from the championship and he returned to South Africa.

Racing record

Complete British Touring Car Championship results
(key) (Races in bold indicate pole position - 1 point awarded in first race) (Races in italics indicate fastest lap - 1 point awarded all races) (* signifies that driver lead race for at least one lap - 1 point awarded all races)

External links
 BTCC Pages Profile.

South African racing drivers
British Touring Car Championship drivers
1970 births
Living people